A statue of sportscaster Chick Hearn by Julie Rotblatt Amrany and Omri Amrany is installed outside Los Angeles' Crypto.com Arena, in the U.S. state of California. The bronze and steel sculpture was unveiled in 2010. An empty chair is provided next to the statue to allow people to sit in for a picture taking.

References 

2010 establishments in California
2010 sculptures
Bronze sculptures in California
Monuments and memorials in Los Angeles
Outdoor sculptures in Greater Los Angeles
Sculptures of men in California
South Park (Downtown Los Angeles)
Statues in Los Angeles